George R. McKay (1817March 21, 1890) was a Michigan politician.

Early life
McKay was born in 1817 in Caledonia, New York. In 1852, McKay moved to Marengo, Michigan, where bought a farm to live on.

Career
On November 8, 1864, McKay was elected to the Michigan House of Representatives where he represented the Calhoun County 2nd district from January 4, 1865 to December 31, 1866. McKay was an influential member of the Grange. McKay was a Republican until 1872, when he became a Democrat.

Personal life
McKay was widowed upon his wife's death in 1879.

Later life and death
At some point, McKay moved to Chicago and Kansas. He moved back to Marengo, Michigan in 1888. McKay died in Marengo on March 21, 1890.

References

1817 births
1890 deaths
Farmers from Michigan
People from Caledonia, New York
People from Calhoun County, Michigan
Members of the Michigan House of Representatives
Michigan Republicans
Michigan Democrats
19th-century American politicians